SS Cristoforo Colombo was an Italian ocean liner built in the 1950s, sister ship of the .

Origins and construction

The origins of the Cristoforo Colombo lie in the situation of the Italian Line at the end of World War II. The Italian Line at this point decided to build only moderately-sized ships that were very luxurious, comfortable, and stylish.

The Cristoforo Colombo was built in Genoa at the Ansaldo Shipyards. The Andrea Doria was already built by the time Cristoforo Colombo was completed. She was launched in 1953 and was ready for a 1954 maiden voyage. When launched, the Cristoforo Colombo was larger than the Andrea Doria. Hence, the ship was the largest merchant ship in Italian service.

Italian Line service

In the spring of 1964, the Cristoforo Colombo carried the Pietà from the Vatican to the 1964 New York World's Fair. Pietà was put in a crate that was filled with plastic foam, which was lowered onto a rubber base in the first class pool where the least damage was likely to happen to it. During the actual loading, the Cristoforo Colombo had been put in dry dock so that she would not move and jeopardize the crate and its content. Only easily removable snap hooks secured the crate so that it could be released easily in case of accident. In case the Cristoforo Colombo sank during the voyage, the crate had the ability to float. In New York, the crate was lifted by a heavy-lift floating crane onto a barge that was put alongside the ship.

She was painted entirely white in 1966 in order to match with the other ships in the Italian Line, who had abandoned black as a hull color. The ship brought many Italian postwar immigrants to the United States and Canada calling at Halifax and New York in the last decades of large-scale ocean liner immigration to North America. Cristoforo Colombo was the last ship to bring immigrants to the historical Canadian immigration terminal Pier 21 on March 30, 1971, the day before the Pier closed its doors.

In popular culture
The Cristoforo Colombo is prominently featured in the 1962 Warner Brothers film Rome Adventure starring Suzanne Pleshette, Troy Donahue and Rossano Brazzi.
The opening titles of the 1971 film The Burglars ("Le Casse") by Henri Verneuil shows the Cristoforo Colombo at dock in Athens, Greece. The ship's name is clearly seen.

Retirement from Italian Line service
In 1973, the Cristoforo Colombo gave up the New York service. It was therefore redirected to the Genoa-Barcelona-Lisbon-Rio-Montevideo-BuenosAires service to replace the  that had suffered serious mechanical problems. As the South American service accepted a ship of sub-standard maintenance, she stayed,  until 1977. She was then sold to Venezuela, where she was used as an accommodation ship for workers at Ciudad Guayana.

In 1981, the Cristoforo Colombo was sold to US scrappers. However, upon arrival at Kaohsiung, Cristoforo Colombo was towed to Hong Kong with hopes of returning to service. As the ship was expensive to operate (she was designed to operate on an Italian subsidy) and was in poor condition after her time in Venezuela, the Cristoforo Colombo'' was towed back to Kaohsiung in the autumn of 1982 and scrapped.

References

Ocean liners
Passenger ships of Italy
1953 ships
Ships built in Genoa
Ships built by Gio. Ansaldo & C.